Riverstone, an electoral district of the Legislative Assembly in the Australian state of New South Wales, was created in 1981.


Members for Riverstone

Election results

Elections in the 2010s

2019

2015

2011

Elections in the 2000s

2007

2003

Elections in the 1990s

1999

1995

1991

Elections in the 1980s

1988

1984

1983 by-election

1981

References

New South Wales state electoral results by district